Abominator is the debut album of the horror punk/heavy metal band Doyle, founded and led by guitarist Doyle Wolfgang von Frankenstein of the Misfits. The album was released in July 2013.

Release 
It was digitally released on July 30, 2013, and physically on CD and vinyl of July that year. It was independently distributed and released on Doyle's own label, Monsterman Records. The CD version of the album included an additional track, "Drawing Down the Moon".

Despite being released in 2013, due to Doyle's touring schedule in support of the album and use of social media sites, the album continues to sell and has sold just under 10,000 copies in the United States alone and has shipped 20,000 worldwide. Doyle continued to tour in March 2015 in support the album.

Track listing 
All songs by written by Alex Story and Doyle Wolfgang von Frankenstein, except where noted.
"Abominator" – 4:00
"Learn to Bleed" – 3:15
"Dreamingdeadgirls" – 4:13
"Headhunter" – 3:37
"Valley of Shadows" – 4:24
"Land of the Dead" – 3:36
"Cemeterysexxx" – 4:08
"Love Like Murder" – 3:31
"Mark of the Beast" (Story, Doyle, Lucas Banker) – 4:12
"Drawing Down the Moon" (Story, Doyle, Banker)- 4:16
"Bloodstains" – 4:36
"Hope Hell Is Warm" – 3:59
Note: The vinyl release switches the tracks "Headhunter" and "Drawing Down the Moon".

Personnel 
 Alex "Wolfman" Story – vocals, lyrics
 Doyle Wolfgang von Frankenstein – guitars, bass, musical arrangements, production
 The Abominable Dr. Chud – drums
 Nick Chinboukas – mixing engineer
 Paul Suarez – assistant engineer
 Roger Lian – mastering
 Boriss Wolfgang von Frankenstein – executive producer

References 

2013 debut albums
Doyle (band) albums